Jaada Lawrence-Green (born 26 July 1997) is a British actress and model. She began her professional career as a child model at the age of one years old and is known for her work on Black Widow, Diamond Bradley in The Shadows of Death, Kimberly Woodruff in Breaking the Band and Marnie Dawson in Holby City.

Personal life 
Lawrence-Green was born on July 26, 1997, in Birmingham, United Kingdom and is of Jamaican descent.

Career 
Lawrence-Green has worked on stage, television, and film. In 1998, at one years old Lawrence-Green signed as a child model who showcased in numerous commercials and campaigns for clients including Boots, Benetton and Avery Labels. Since then, Lawrence-Green has continued to appear in various commercials and campaigns for companies including Google Play, Calor Gas, Ickle Bubba and Kenwood.

Lawrence-Green trained at Brit Youth Theatre School and Identity School of Acting. She began her acting career performing in theatre productions, with a stage debut in Footloose the musical in 2009. Lawrence-Green was cast as the lead character Diamond Bradley in The Shadows of Death, the critically acclaimed crime series released on Investigation Discovery, Kimberly Woodruff, wife of American rapper Ice Cube in Breaking the Band, Cheerleader in Urban Myths and guest starred as Marnie Dawson in television medical series Holby City. Lawrence-Green also starred as a double in Marvel's Black Widow for the character of Lerato.

In 2011, aged 13, Lawrence-Green discovered an interest in pop music. Lawrence-Green showcased her musical talent performing live at concerts and releasing original pop songs including "Rock It" in 2011, "Summertime" in 2012 and "Jump" in 2013 as a solo music artist named "Miss J". "Miss J" featured in various magazines including Urban Teen magazine, Just Kids Magazine and Starbound Magazine. Her music also featured on numerous radio stations including BBC radio, Alive radio and Off the Chart Radio.

References

External links 

1997 births
Living people
Actresses from Birmingham, West Midlands
British people of Jamaican descent
British female models
British television actresses
British film actresses